Sarah Dawson (born November 17, 1982) is an American field hockey forward/midfielder, who earned her first senior career cap during the New Zealand Tour on May 16, 2005.

Dawson grew up in Berlin, New Jersey and attended Eastern Regional High School, where she graduated in 2001. She graduated from the University of Iowa in 2005, where she played for the Hawkeyes, having majored in Communications and Sports Studies. She has resided in Virginia Beach, Virginia.

International senior competitions
 2007 – XV Pan American Games, Rio de Janeiro, Brazil (2nd)

References

1982 births
Living people
American female field hockey players
Eastern Regional High School alumni
People from Berlin, New Jersey
Sportspeople from Virginia Beach, Virginia
Iowa Hawkeyes field hockey players
University of Iowa alumni
Sportspeople from Camden County, New Jersey